MV Dongfang zhi Xing (translated as Oriental Star or Eastern Star) was a river cruise ship that operated in the Three Gorges region of inland China. On the night of 1 June 2015, the ship was traveling on the Yangtze River when it capsized during a thunderstorm in Jianli, Hubei Province with 454 people on board. On 13 June, 442 deaths were confirmed, with 12 survivors (including two rescued by officials). The passengers were mostly in their 60s and 70s, and mostly from Nanjing, where the ship started its cruise.

The final investigation concluded the ship navigated into a squall line (the biggest scale of thunderstorm) from 21:19 onwards, blasted by a downburst (a form of windshear) from 21:26 to 21:32, capsized at 21:31, and sank at 21:32. The ship met gusts of 32–38 m/s (72-85 mph, equivalent to wind force scale of 12-13). The hourly rain was observed at 94.4mm.

It is the deadliest peacetime maritime disaster in China's history, and the worst maritime disaster (including wartime disasters) in China's history since the steamer  sank in January 1949, killing more than 1,500.

Sinking
Around 21:28 on 1 June 2015, Dongfang zhi Xing was making a  trip from Nanjing to Chongqing on the Yangtze River.

Passengers and crew 

Initially, the Chinese authorities reported 458 people were aboard the ship, but later reduced this figure to 456. This included 405 passengers, all of whom were Chinese and mostly elderly, 46 crew members and five tour guides. According to crew members that were rescued, the storm hit and capsized the ship quickly while most of the passengers were asleep. One rescued passenger stated that the ship had become flooded with water, and with the turbulent river conditions, capsized after experiencing a list greater than 45 degrees. Seven survivors were able to swim to shore and alert authorities about two and a half hours after capsizing. On 13 June, the Chinese authorities updated that 454, not 456, people were on board and 442 bodies had been found with 12 rescued.

Analysis of the incident
Severe weather reports were issued for the area, which should have subsequently been sent to all vessels on the river in the area for them to take necessary precautions. There is no confirmation that Dongfang zhi Xing had been properly notified, though at least one other vessel travelling nearby was shown to have taken precautions due to the weather warning. The ship's captain and chief engineer, two of the rescued persons, were taken into custody for questioning.

The Chinese government censored news and discussion about this accident, while tightly controlling media coverage. The Politburo Standing Committee attempted to control public opinion about the disaster response, by issuing an order to both "understand the sorrow of the families" and "concretely preserve social stability".

On 30 December 2015, the Chinese government issued the investigation report on the incident. The report said that heavy storms caused Dongfang zhi Xing to capsize; it also found that the shipping company and local authorities had flaws in their daily management and suggested that 43 people be punished accordingly.

Ship

MV Dongfang zhi Xing was constructed in February 1994. It underwent another retrofit in 2008 that cut its capacity from 584 to 534 people. It was owned by the Chongqing Eastern Shipping Corporation and operated by Xiehe Travel. It made cruises in the Three Gorges area of inland China.

Dongfang zhi Xing, as well as other Yangtze River cruise ships, had come under increasing government scrutiny in recent years due to the growing tourist industry in China. In 2013, Dongfang zhi Xing and five other ships were cited for safety violations by the Nanjing maritime bureau, though the Chongqing Eastern Shipping Corporation did not comment on the nature of these infractions.

Rescue
Rescue efforts were made immediately to save the passengers and crew, reaching full scale about twelve hours after the capsizing. Fourteen people were rescued in the immediate aftermath, including the ship's engineer and captain.

According to a tweet from China Central Television (CCTV), rescuers were able to hear the sound of people trapped inside the vessel. CCTV reported that search teams heard people yelling from within the ship. One thousand police officers from the Hubei Armed Police Corps were sent to the site with 40 inflatable boats. Authorities reported that the search and rescue effort included 3,000 people and 50 boats. Crews used both underwater approaches with diving apparatus, and above-water approaches through holes cut through the inverted hull.

The Three Gorges Dam upriver was instructed to cut water flow rates by half in order to lower the river levels for the rescue effort.

On 5 June, the inverted ship was fitted with cables and nets, and the holes cut in the hull sealed, in order to right the ship and resume the search for survivors or bodies. The search yielded only bodies.

The highest levels of government were involved in the search coordination. Communist Party General Secretary Xi Jinping and Chinese Premier Li Keqiang ordered rescue efforts.  Premier Li Keqiang, Vice Premier Ma Kai and State Councilor Yang Jing traveled to the site.

Mourning
On 7 June, more than 500 rescue workers and government officials at the site mourned during a three-minute silence, after an announcement from Minister of Transport Yang Chuantang. According to Chinese tradition, the seventh day is a key occasion to mourn the passing of the dead.

To mourn the victims, all Chinese satellite television channels suspended entertainment programs from 7 to 8 June.

See also
 List of shipwrecks in China
 MV Teratai Prima

References

External links
图文直播：载456人客轮沉没 长江大救援！！！ (ifeng.com)
载458人客轮在长江湖北段倾覆 (Netease)
实时播报：全力搜救“东方之星” (Sina)
"东方之星"倾覆长江 上载458人 (Sohu)

2015 disasters in China
History of Hubei
Dongfang zhi Xing
Dongfang zhi Xing
Dongfang zhi Xing
Dongfang zhi Xing
Yangtze River
June 2015 events in China